This is a list of film chronicles produced in Albania during the 1950s.

Film chronicles
 Shqipëria e Re. Kinozhurnal Nr.1 (1950)
 Shqipëria e Re. Kinozhurnal Nr.2 (1950)
 Shqipëria e Re. Kinozhurnal Nr.3 (1950)
 Shqipëria e Re. Kinozhurnal Nr.4 (1950)
 Shqipëria e Re. Kinozhurnal Nr.5 (1951)
 Shqipëria e Re. Kinozhurnal Nr.6 (1951
Skënderbeu (1953)
Fëmijët e saj (1957)
Tana (1958)
 Furtuna (1959)

References

Lists of Albanian films